Agnippe pseudolella is a moth of the family Gelechiidae. It is found in Turkey, Russia (Volgograd Oblast, Astrakhan Oblast), Kazakhstan, northern Iran, Turkmenistan, Tajikistan and China (Inner Mongolia).

The wingspan is 8.3–10 mm. The forewings have a black basal patch and two black spots separated by white scales. The hindwings are light grey. Adults are on wing from May to July.

References

Moths described in 1888
Agnippe
Moths of Asia